This is a list of UEFA club competition winning football managers. It includes victories in the European Cup and UEFA Champions League, the UEFA Cup Winners' Cup, the UEFA Cup and Europa League, the UEFA Europa Conference League, the UEFA Intertoto Cup, the UEFA Super Cup and the Intercontinental Cup.

Italian Carlo Ancelotti is the most successful manager, claiming 9 titles. Italian managers have won more tournaments than any other nationality, having secured 50 titles, while Spanish managers are in second place with 42 competition victories.

Although no manager has ever won all of these competitions, Giovanni Trapattoni is the only manager to have claimed the title of five different confederation tournaments. Trapattoni and German Udo Lattek are the only managers to have won at least once the three seasonal pre-1999 UEFA competitions: the European Cup, the Cup Winners' Cup and the UEFA Cup. Portuguese José Mourinho is the first manager to win at least once the three current seasonal UEFA competitions: the UEFA Champions League, the UEFA Cup or Europa League, and the UEFA Europa Conference League. Zinedine Zidane is the only manager to win three UEFA Champions League tournaments in a row, winning with Real Madrid in the 2015–16, 2016–17, and 2017–18 seasons.

While the Inter-Cities Fairs Cup is considered to be the predecessor to the UEFA Cup, the Union of European Football Associations (UEFA) does not recognise it officially, and therefore successes in this competition are not included in this list. Also excluded are the unofficial 1972 European Super Cup, and the Club World Cup, a FIFA competition.

Starting the 2021–22 football season, UEFA commenced the UEFA Europa Conference League which is a third seasonal competition organized by UEFA. For this reason, a manager can now win three main UEFA club competitions which was previously not possible since the UEFA Cup Winners' Cup was last competed in 1999.

Winning managers
The following lists have been last updated on 10 August 2022, after the 2022 UEFA Super Cup.

By number of titles

 

Key

By nationality
This table lists the total number of titles won by managers of each nationality.

References

General

Specific

External links
 

UEFA Club competition